Vorkuta Airport  is a small airport in the Komi Republic, Russia located 3 km west of Vorkuta. It accommodates small airliners. The pavement length is 2,200 meters; however, it is shortened 300 m due to a displaced threshold.

Airlines and destinations

See also
Yamburg Airport

References

Vorkuta Airport at Russian Airports Database

External links
 Great Circle Mapper: NOZ / UNYW - Vorkuta, Vorkuta, Russian Federation (Russia)
 ASN Accident history for UNYW
 Historical Weather Records for Vorkuta

Airports built in the Soviet Union
Airports in the Arctic
Airports in the Komi Republic